Angelica Jade Bastién is an American essayist and critic. She is a staff writer for Vulture, where she has reviewed film and written television recaps since 2015. Bastién also specializes in horror and depictions of women and madness. She has published writing in The New York Times, The Village Voice, Harper's Bazaar, Criterion.com, and others. Her work has been cited in outlets including Vanity Fair, Vox, and The Independent.

Career 
Bastién is a staff writer for Vulture, where she reviews film and television. She has contributed writing to The Atlantic, The New York Times, The Village Voice, The New Republic, and others. Her criticism synthesizes her analysis of the casting, plot, and cinematography with off-screen production decisions and the media industry at large. Frequents topics of her analysis include feminism and representations of Black people in film and television. She has a strong personal interest in the horror genre and is also known as an expert on the work of Keanu Reeves. Bastién cited Angela Carter, Toni Morrison, and James Baldwin as her biggest writing influences.

Bastién's writing also explores depictions of women, mental health, and madness. She has connected her personal experiences with mental illness to her criticism. Bastién named Now, Voyager as a movie that has great personal significance to her and appeared on the podcast On Being to discuss the film. The episode "This Movie Changed Me: "Now, Voyager"" was named a 2019 Webby Award honoree.

Her writing has been cited widely in mainstream outlets such as Jezebel, The Washington Post, The A.V. Club, and the Los Angeles Times. She has provided commentary to WBEZ, The Guardian, and 1A.

Personal life 
Bastién was raised in Miami and her family is from Louisiana. She is Afro-Latina. She resides in Chicago, where she received her bachelor's degree from Columbia College Chicago.

Awards and nominations 
2022 ASME Awards

 Nominee, Essays and Criticism category, for "Them Is Pure Degradation Porn"
 Nominee, Essays and Criticism category, for "The Underground Railroad is the Cinematic Event of the Year"
 Nominee, Essays and Criticism category, for "Cruella is the Girl-Bossification of the Madwoman"

References

External links 
 Angelica Jade Bastién on Twitter
 Angelica Jade Bastién on Vulture.com
 Angelica Jade Bastién on Rotten Tomatoes
 This Movie Changed Me: "Now Voyager"—Angelica Jade Bastién on the podcast On Being

21st-century American women writers
Afro–Latin American
American critics
American feminist writers
American film critics
American women film critics
American essayists
American women essayists
Living people
Writers from Miami
Year of birth missing (living people)
Hispanic and Latino American women
Hispanic and Latino American writers
Columbia College Chicago alumni
21st-century African-American women writers
21st-century African-American writers